Richard "Dick" Wallace (born 1944) is an English-born Welsh rugby union and professional rugby league footballer who played in the 1970s.

Playing career

Representative honours
Although born in England, Wallace was eligible to play for Wales through his Welsh grandparents. Wallace won a cap for Wales (RL) while at York in the 1975 Rugby League World Cup against France. He also represented Other Nationalities six times in the 1974 and 1975 county championships.

County Cup Final appearances
Wallace played  in Hull Kingston Rovers' 11-15 defeat by Leeds in the 1975 Yorkshire County Cup Final during the 1975–76 season at Headingley Rugby Stadium, Leeds on Saturday 15 November 1975.

Club career
Wallace joined Huddersfield from rugby union in 1966. He made 157 appearances for the club before moving to York in 1972. He played a further 92 games for York before moving to Hull Kingston Rovers in 1975.

References

 Match programme - Wales vs France (16 Feb 1975)

External links

1944 births
Living people
English people of Welsh descent
English rugby league players
English rugby union players
Huddersfield Giants players
Hull Kingston Rovers players
Rugby league centres
Rugby league fullbacks
Rugby league five-eighths
Rugby league players from Bristol
Rugby union players from Bristol
Wales national rugby league team players
York Wasps players